Feel the Fire is the tenth studio album by Canadian country music group Family Brown. It was released in 1985 by RCA Records and was the final album to include founding member Joe Brown, who died in 1986. The album includes the singles, "Feel the Fire", "What If It's Right", "Wouldn't You Love Us Together Again", and "I Love You More", which all charted on the RPM Country Tracks chart in Canada. The album won the awards for Album of the Year at the 1985 RPM Big Country Awards and the 1986 Canadian Country Music Association Awards.

Track listing

References

1985 albums
Family Brown albums
RCA Records albums
Canadian Country Music Association Album of the Year albums